Bulduq is a village and municipality in the Sabirabad District of Azerbaijan. It has a population of 1,797.

Climate
During the year, there is little rainfall in Buldug. The average temperature is 17.3 °C and the average rainfall is 328 mm.

References 

Populated places in Sabirabad District